Ulcat Row (also Ulcatrow) is a village in the civil parish of Matterdale, in the Eden district, in the county of Cumbria, England. In the 2011 census, the parish had 483 residents, roughlt an 8% decrease from 526 residents in 2001. Ulcat Row is located approximately eight miles south west of Penrith. The name originally meant "Owl Cottage Corner".

References

Villages in Cumbria
Eden District